Heliconia burleana is a species of plant in the family Heliconiaceae. It is native to Ecuador, Colombia and Peru.  Its natural habitat is subtropical or tropical moist montane forest.

References

External links
 Heliconia burleana observations on iNaturalist

Flora of Ecuador
Flora of Peru
Flora of Colombia
burleana